Detmer (or Detmers) is a Germanic surname. It may refer to:

A. M. Detmer (c. 1885), U.S. tailor (see A. M. Detmer House)
Amanda Detmer (born 1971), U.S. actress
Don E. Detmer (born ?), U.S. doctor and professor
Freda Detmers (1867-1934), U.S. botanist
Hendrik Detmers (1761–1825), Dutch general
Joseph Detmer (born 1983), U.S. decathlete and icosathlete
Julian Francis Detmer (1865–1958), U.S. business man (see Detmer Woolen Company)
Koy Detmer (born 1973), U.S. football player
Maruschka Detmers (born 1962), Dutch actress
Reid Detmers (born 1999), American baseball player
Theodor Detmers (1902–1976), German naval commander
Ty Detmer (born 1967), U.S. football player
Wilhelm Detmer (1850–1930), German botanist and agriculturalist